Terron Armstead (born July 23, 1991) is an American football offensive tackle for the Miami Dolphins of the National Football League (NFL). He was drafted by the Saints in the third round of the 2013 NFL Draft. He played college football at Arkansas–Pine Bluff. Armstead was named HBCU Top 30 Under 30 by HBCU Buzz, in July 2014.

Early years
A native of Cahokia, Illinois, Armstead attended Cahokia High School, where he was a letterman in football and track. He grew from a 6-2, 250-pound offensive lineman as a junior to a 6-4, 300-pound senior, leading Comanches to an 11-2 record and league title, earning All-Southern Seven Conference and All-Class 5A selection.

In track & field, Armstead was named the News-Democrat Track & Field Athlete of the Year after capturing the state title in the shot put event with a  throw. He also threw the discus.

College career
Armstead enrolled in the University of Arkansas at Pine Bluff, where he played for the UAPB Golden Lions football team from 2009 to 2012. He was an All-Southwestern Athletic Conference (SWAC) selection during his final three seasons at Arkansas-Pine Bluff.

Track and field
Armstead was also on the Arkansas-Pine Bluff Golden Lions track & field team, where he competed as a shot putter, discus thrower and hammer thrower. He got a personal-record of 18.73 meters in the shot put at the 2012 NCAA West Regional, placing 10th. At the 2012 Pepsi Florida Relays, he placed 4th in the discus throw with a career-best throw of 50.37 meters.

Professional career
At the 2013 NFL Combine, Armstead ran a 4.71-second 40-yard dash, which was the fastest 40-yard dash time of any offensive lineman at the combine since it first began in 1982.

New Orleans Saints
Armstead was drafted in the third round, with the 75th overall pick, of the 2013 NFL Draft by the New Orleans Saints, making him the highest draft pick ever out of Arkansas-Pine Bluff. The pick was announced by retired Saint Steve Gleason, at the time using a wheelchair and a computerized voice due to his advanced ALS.

On May 9, 2013, the Saints signed Armstead to a four-year, $2.86 million contract, with a $617,436 signing bonus. Armstead began his rookie season as the back up left tackle behind Charles Brown. On September 22, 2013, he played in his first regular season game against the Arizona Cardinals. On December 22, 2013, he received his first start against the Carolina Panthers. He remained the starting left tackle for the last four games of the Saints season. Armstead began the 2014 season as the Saints' starting left tackle after Charles Brown left during the off season via free agency. He started the first 14 games of the season but missed the last two, due to injury. Armstead returned as the Saints' starting left tackle for the 2015 season and started the first four games. After missing two games due to an injury, he returned Week 7 to play the next 9 games in a row. Armstead also missed the last game of the season against the Atlanta Falcons. Armstead was voted as a Pro Bowl alternate in 2015. After a promising season, he was rated the third-best offensive tackle in all of football in 2015 by Pro Football Focus.

On May 3, 2016, Armstead and the Saints agreed to a five-year, $65 million contract extension. The contract is guaranteed for $38 million and includes an $11 million signing bonus. After starting the first two games of the 2016 season, Armstead was unable to play for Weeks 3 and 4 after suffering a knee injury. He was placed on injured reserve on December 14, 2016. On June 14, 2017, during minicamp, Armstead suffered a torn labrum which required surgery, which was expected to make him miss 4–6 months. He returned earlier than expected, however, and started ten games at left tackle during the regular season.

Armstead was placed on the reserve/COVID-19 list by the team on November 28, 2020, and activated on December 9.

Miami Dolphins
On March 22, 2022, the Miami Dolphins signed Armstead to a five-year, $75 million deal worth up to $87.5 million, with $43.37 million in guaranteed money.

Armstead was named to his 4th pro bowl this season.

References

External links
 New Orleans Saints bio
 Arkansas–Pine Bluff Golden Lions bio
 

1991 births
Living people
American football offensive tackles
Arkansas–Pine Bluff Golden Lions football players
New Orleans Saints players
Miami Dolphins players
People from Cahokia, Illinois
Players of American football from Illinois
Sportspeople from Greater St. Louis
National Conference Pro Bowl players
Ed Block Courage Award recipients
American Conference Pro Bowl players